American country singer-songwriter, Abby Anderson released her five-song debut, I'm Good, through Black River Entertainment in 2018.

Extended plays

Singles

As lead artist

Other appearance

Note

References 

Discographies of American artists
Country music discographies